Isaac Russell (April 13, 1807 – September 25, 1844) was a leader in the early Latter Day Saint movement. Russell held a number of positions of responsibility, including being one of the first missionaries to England, with Heber C. Kimball, Willard Richards, Orson Hyde, Joseph Fielding, and J. E. Goodson. He also organized the Alston Church in 1837.

Early life
Isaac Russell at Windy Haugh, near Alston, Cumberland, England, to William Russell and Isabella Peart.  He was the youngest of thirteen children.  In 1817 the family emigrated from England to Upper Canada.

Latter Day Saint movement
Russell and his family were baptized into the Church of the Latter Day Saints on May 21, 1836, by Parley P. Pratt, along with the families of John Taylor, Joseph Fielding, and others. Russell joined the body of the Latter Day Saints in Kirtland, Ohio, in 1837.

Alston Church
As the Latter Day Saints were fleeing Missouri in the winter of 1838–39, Russell claimed to have received revelations directing him to remain in Missouri by leading the church into Indian Territory, where the Three Nephites would join them to convert the Lamanites. His organization was called the Alston Church. He was alleged to have said that Joseph Smith had "fallen" and that he, Isaac, was now the prophet.

On April 26, 1839, Russell, along with most, if not all, of his followers were excommunicated.

After accusing Russell of usurping authority over a small group of his converts and behaving as their prophet, most of these Alston saints immigrated to Nauvoo, Illinois, by the winter of 1843.

Death
Russell stayed in Far West, Missouri, among anti-Mormon mobs, never rejoined the Latter Day Saints, and died in 1844 on his farm near Richmond, Missouri, of "swamp fever." His youngest child, Isabella Russell, born a year before his death, later wrote his biography. Isaac's widow Mary Russell and their children never denied their faith in Joseph Smith and were never excommunicated. In 1861, after saving enough money, they moved to Salt Lake City, Utah Territory and lived among friends and family in the Latter-day Saint community.

References

External links
Isaac Russell correspondence, MSS 497 at L. Tom Perry Special Collections, Brigham Young University

1807 births
1844 deaths
American Latter Day Saints
British Latter Day Saints
Converts to Mormonism
English Latter Day Saint missionaries
English Latter Day Saints
English emigrants to pre-Confederation Ontario
English emigrants to the United States
Immigrants to Upper Canada
Latter Day Saint leaders
Latter Day Saint missionaries in England
Latter Day Saint missionaries in the United States
People excommunicated by the Church of Christ (Latter Day Saints)
People from Alston, Cumbria